Distimake tuberosus, also known as Spanish arborvine or wood rose, is a vine in the family Convolvulaceae. It is native to the Americas, from Florida and Texas to Brazil, although considered by the USDA as introduced to the United States. It is an invasive species in a number of islands in the Indian and Pacific Ocean, such as New Caledonia.

References

External links
 

Flora of Mexico
Flora of Peru
Convolvulaceae